The Donauturm is a tower in Vienna, the tallest structure in Austria at , and is the 68th tallest tower in the world. Opening in April 1964, the tower is located near the north bank of the Danube River in the district of Donaustadt.

History
The Donauturm was constructed during 1962–1964, as designed by architect Hannes Lintl, in preparation for the Viennese International Horticultural Show 1964. Groundbreaking took place on 12 October 1962. After approximately 18 months of construction, under the supervision of Eberhard Födisch, the tower was officially opened on 16 April 1964 by Federal President Adolf Schärf.

Since then, it has become a part of the Viennese skyline and has become a popular lookout point and a tourist attraction. It is situated in the middle of the Donaupark, which was built to host the horticultural fair in Vienna's 22nd District, Donaustadt, near the northern bank of the Danube.

Facilities

High-speed elevators 

Each lift, carrying up to 14 passengers, takes only 35 seconds to reach the observation platform. In strong winds, the elevators travel at only half speed because of the possible fluctuation of the tower: the movement of the elevator cable could be dangerous. By walking about 779 steps (775, according to architects Lintl), the platform can also be reached on foot. The stairs are, however, usually only accessible during the annual Donauturm run, or in an emergency.

Antennas and radio transmitter 

The Donauturm spire carries antennas of cellular phone networks, private VHF radio stations and several other radio communication services.  Despite its similarity to TV towers elsewhere, it has not been used for TV broadcasting. The major TV transmitter for the Vienna area is situated on Kahlenberg hill (see image at top).

Viewing platform 

Two revolving restaurants (at a height of 161.2 and 169.4 metres, or 529 and 556 ft) offer a varied view over the Austrian capital and the Danube River below. It takes the platform either 26, 39 or 52 minutes to complete a full revolution.  The restaurants were originally largely identical; now the top is an "upscale" restaurant (named "Turm-Restaurant") and the lower restaurant is a café (named "Turm-Café").

Ballooning accident in 1968
At a meeting of Pro Juventute on 6 June 1968, four gas balloons were launched from a meadow at Donauturm. While three of them floated past the tower, the fourth was driven against the tower, where it was initially hung on the security grills, at a height of approx. 150 m. The balloon net tore and the balloon envelope broke free. The remnants of the net and the basket fell to the ground. American balloonist Francis Shields died, along with two Austrian passengers: a higher official of the Austrian Post and Telegraph Management, Guntram Pammer, and journalist Dieter Kasper of the Austrian Press agency.

Footage of the incident appeared in the film Days of Fury (1979), directed by Fred Warshofsky and hosted by Vincent Price.

Wikipedia naming controversy 

The Donauturm shares some architectural features with the Fernsehturm Stuttgart, but was never planned for TV broadcasting purposes. The German Wikipedia had an approximately 600,000-character discussion about the suitable title and categories, as some authors, many of them Austrian, regarded the Donauturm as a mere observation tower. The Spiegel coverage of the issue cited a participant with "On good days, Wikipedia is better than any TV soap".

See also
 Wiener Riesenrad – giant Ferris wheel in Vienna
 List of tallest buildings and structures in Austria
 Fernsehturm Stuttgart – first TV tower built from concrete and prototype
 Fernsehturm Berlin – similar tower in Berlin, Germany (although 45% taller)
 List of towers
 List of masts
 List of restaurants in Vienna

References

External links

 Official website
 
 Footage of the 1968 accident.
  360° panorama of Vienna, seen from the restaurant

Towers completed in 1964
Buildings and structures in Donaustadt
Observation towers in Austria
Towers with revolving restaurants
Restaurants in Vienna
Radio masts and towers in Europe
Towers in Vienna
1964 establishments in Austria
Communication towers in Austria
20th-century architecture in Austria